The 1984–85 Luxembourg National Division was the 71st season of top level association football in Luxembourg.

Overview
It was performed in 12 teams, and Jeunesse Esch won the championship.

League standings

Results

References
Luxembourg - List of final tables (RSSSF)

Luxembourg National Division seasons
Lux
1984–85 in Luxembourgian football